Nino Defilippis (21 March 1932, in Turin – 13 July 2010, in Turin) was an Italian road bicycle racer who won the Giro di Lombardia in 1958, as well as nine stages at the Giro d'Italia, seven stages at the Tour de France and two stages at the Vuelta a España. He also won the mountains classification at the 1956 Vuelta a España and the Italian National Road Race Championship in 1956 and 1958.

Major results
Giro di Lombardia (1958)
 Italian National Road Race Championship (1960, 1962)
Tre Valli Varesine (1953, 1960)
Giro del Piemonte (1954, 1958)
Giro dell'Emilia (1954, 1955)
Giro del Lazio (1958, 1962)
Giro di Toscana (1960)
Trofeo Baracchi (1952) (with Giancarlo Astrua)
Giro del Veneto (1961)
9 stage victories in the Giro d'Italia
7 stage victories in the Tour de France
2 stage victories in the Vuelta a España

References

External links

1932 births
2010 deaths
Italian male cyclists
Cyclists from Turin
Italian Tour de France stage winners
Italian Giro d'Italia stage winners
Italian Vuelta a España stage winners
Tour de Suisse stage winners